Hoseynabad (also Romanized as Ḩoseynābād; also known as Hosein Abad Arzoo’eyeh and Ḩoseynābād-e Ārzū’īyeh) is a village in Arzuiyeh Rural District, in the Central District of Arzuiyeh County, Kerman Province, Iran. At the 2006 census, its population was 478, in 109 families.

References 

Populated places in Arzuiyeh County